The McDonald Centre for Theology, Ethics & Public Life is a research institute in the University of Oxford, which is associated with the Faculty of Theology. Its director is Nigel Biggar, Regius Professor of Moral and Pastoral Theology. The current McDonald Fellow for Christian Ethics & Public Life is John Perry.

The Centre supports research on the contribution of Christian traditions to the understanding of moral life in conversation, with other traditions of religious and philosophical thought. It fosters collaboration both between theology and other disciplines, and between academia and those who shape public deliberation and policy. In publishing the research that it supports, the Centre addresses academic, church, and wider public audiences.

In 2017, the McDonald Centre attracted controversy after receiving funding from Oxford University for its project Ethics and Empire, which Director Nigel Biggar said aimed to "pay careful attention to the historical variety of things that empire can be, and work out a more sophisticated way of evaluating them morally.” In response, more than 170 scholars of imperialism signed a joint letter condemning Oxford University's support for the project. The signatories stated that “We are not surprised that such an approach should be recuperated by Prof Biggar – a long-time apologist for colonialism – but we are alarmed that the University of Oxford should invest resources in this project.”

External links
 McDonald Centre website

Departments of the University of Oxford
Political research institutes
Research institutes in Oxford